Sportsnet is group of Canadian regional sports networks.

Sportsnet or sportnet may also refer to:

Sportsnet 
 AT&T SportsNet, the group of American regional sports networks owned AT&T
 Comcast SportsNet, the group of American regional sports networks now known as NBC Sports Regional Networks
 Fox Sports Net, the former group of American regional sports networks
 MSG Sportsnet, the American regional sports network owned by MSG Entertainment
 Spectrum Sports or Spectrum SportsNet, the group of American regional sports networks previously known as Time Warner Cable SportsNet
 SportsNet New York, the American regional sports network based in New York

Sportnet 
 Sportnet or Screensport (TV channel), a Europe-wide sports TV channel that existed from 1984 to 1993 and operated under the name "Sportnet" in the Dutch market
 Sportnet.hr, a Croatian sporting news website